The events of the Ip massacre escalated in the early hours of 14 September 1940, in Ipp, (today Ip, Sălaj County), Northern Transylvania. After two Hungarian soldiers died there in an accidental explosion, rumors spread that they had been killed by Romanians. After another incident the Royal Hungarian Army, influenced by the rumor, indiscriminately massacred around 150 ethnic Romanians in the nearby locations and surrounding areas.

Events
After the Second Vienna Award of 30 August 1940, as a result of German–Italian arbitration, northwestern Transylvania reverted to Hungary. The area ceded by Romania contained the northwestern part of the homonymous region and the Székely lands. A total of eight of the 23 Transylvanian counties that had been part of Romania during the interwar period were entirely alienated, and another three were split. Thus, Sălaj County was also attached to Hungary. On 7 September 1940 the Hungarian Second Army arrived at Ipp (present-day Ip) where they made a short stop. After preparing to leave, more acquired grenades exploded in one of the sling-carts and in the detonation two soldiers died. The negligence of the proper storage was quickly identified but soon rumor had it that it was a willful action. This view escalated rapidly.

On 8 September 1940, the Second Army entered the city of Zalău.

On 13 September, the military commander of the district of Szilágysomlyó (present-day Șimleu Silvaniei) was informed that the nearby villages of Alsókaznacs, Felsőkaznacs, Márkaszék, Porc, Lecsmér, Somály, and Kémer (present-day Cosniciu de Jos, Cosniciu de Sus, Marca, Porț, Leșmir, Șumal, and Camăr) armed Romanian groups were looting. According to the report their number was between 80–100. Based on this report the 32nd Regiment stationing in Zilah (present-day Zalău) assigned a group to investigate the area. Meanwhile, the road, they arrived to Szilágynagyfalu (present-day Nușfalău) where they had been informed a few days before in Ipp two soldiers died in a detonation thus the same day they entered the commune where they conducted a raid instantly.

After the reconnaissance, 18 suspicious persons were found and 16 have been executed, according to the official reports, because of their attempts to desert. Overnight, the Hungarian troops were residing in the local school when they were shot at from the street with a machine gun around 03:00 AM (some witnesses attested that the shooting came from a flat in the center, and five persons with machine guns were captured). In retaliation, between 152 and 158 ethnic Romanians were killed. The commander of the Hungarian troops who perpetrated the massacre of civilians was lieutenant Zoltán Vasváry. Some sources have stated that the Hungarian Army was supported by local vigilantes.
 
The soldiers went house-to-house and shot everybody indiscriminately. On 14 September, in Somlyócsehi (present-day Cehei), one person was killed. In the nearby Felsőkaznacs and Szilágcseres forests (present-day Cosniciu de Sus and Cerișa) 55 persons were killed. According to some other sources, the area most affected was Sălaj, where 477 Romanians were massacred.

On September 14, at the order of Lt. Vasvári, a pit 24 meters long by 4 meters wide was dug in the village cemetery; the corpses of those killed in the massacre were buried head-to-head in two rows, with no religious ceremony.

Trial

The facts were established by Decision no. 1 of the Northern Transylvania People's Tribunal (which sat in Cluj and was presided by Justice Nicolae Matei), in a public sentence from 13 March 1946.  The findings of the Tribunal were as follows:
 Lieutenant colonel Carol Lehotcsky, the military commander of Șimleu Silvaniei district, was found guilty of ordering reprisals against the Romanian inhabitants of Ip and nearby villages.
Ștefan Farago, a landowner from Ip and commander of a local militia was convicted for inducing Lehotcsky to order those repressive measures. (Adalbert Ujhaly was also found to have participated in this inducement, but he had died before the trial.)
Lt. Vasváry was found guilty of commanding the unit that carried out the massacre.
Fifteen locals (Nicolae Bereș, Sigismund P. Bereș, Francisc Borzási, Vasile K. Dereș, Biro Emeric Jr., Biro Emeric Sr., Alexandru Csepe, Francisc I. Csepei, Sigismund Csepei, Paul B. Fazekas, Alexandru Kisfaluși, Bálint Kisfaluși, Arpád Ösz, Ștefan Pinces, and Mihai Soos) were found guilty of cooperating with the Hungarian soldiers in perpetrating the massacre.

See also
 List of massacres in Hungary
 List of massacres in Romania
 Luduș massacre
 Nușfalău massacre
 Sărmașu massacre
 Treznea massacre

References

External links
 Ip massacre 

September 1940 events
Massacres in 1940
World War II massacres
20th century in Transylvania
World War II crimes in Romania
Massacres in Romania
Massacres in Hungary
Military history of Hungary
1940 in Romania
1940 murders in Hungary
Massacres of Romanians
Hungary–Romania relations
September 1940 events in Romania
Hungarian war crimes